Nottingham Cricket Club was an English cricket club which played in Nottingham during the 18th and 19th centuries. Matches have been recorded between 1771 and 1848 and the team played in 15 first-class matches between 1826 and 1848.

The earliest reference to cricket in the county of Nottinghamshire is a match between Nottingham and Sheffield Cricket Club at the Forest Racecourse in Nottingham in August 1771. In many sources, the Nottingham team is called the "Nottingham Old Club" or as the "town club" to distinguish it from Nottinghamshire County Cricket Club, which began playing in the 1840s. Nottinghamshire as a county team played its first inter-county match versus Sussex at Brown's Ground in Brighton in August 1835, with early matches probably being organised by the town club.

There is still a Nottingham Cricket Club, known as Nottinghamians which is part of the rugby union club of that name.

First-class matches played by Nottingham Cricket Club
Nottingham played 15 first-class matches between July 1826 and August 1848. Their first first-class opponents were a Sheffield and Leicester side. Their opponents were most frequently Sheffield, with 12 of the 15 matches against this side. The team also played two matches against the Cambridge Town Club.

See also
 List of Nottingham Cricket Club players

References

1771 establishments in England
English club cricket teams
English cricket in the 19th century
English cricket teams in the 18th century
Former senior cricket clubs
History of Nottingham
Organisations based in Nottingham
Organizations established in 1771
Sport in Nottingham
Sports clubs established in the 1770s